"Your Love" is a song co-written and performed by American recording artist Jim Brickman, with guest singer Michelle Wright. It was released in 1997 on Windham Hill Records as the first single, lead single and as well as the sixth track from his debut compilation album, Visions of Love (1998). It is a country pop song that was written by Dane Deviller, Sean Hosein and Jim Brickman and produced by the latter and by David Pringle.

Charts

References

External links
 
 
 

1997 singles
1997 songs
Jim Brickman songs
Michelle Wright songs
Songs written by Jim Brickman
Songs written by Sean Hosein
Songs written by Dane Deviller
Country ballads
Pop ballads